Morgali is a rural locality (a village) in Ust-Kachkinskoye Rural Settlement, Permsky District, Perm Krai, Russia. The population was 5 as of 2010. There is 1 street.

Geography 
Morgali is located 57 km west of Perm (the district's administrative centre) by road. Zaozerye is the nearest rural locality.

References 

Rural localities in Permsky District